Sphagnum rubellum, the red peat moss, is a widespread species of moss in the family Sphagnaceae, native to the cool temperate parts of North America and Eurasia. It is slower growing than its close relative Sphagnum capillifolium.

References

rubellum
Flora of North America
Flora of Europe
Flora of temperate Asia
Plants described in 1855